The 1951 Bulgarian Cup was the 11th season of the Bulgarian Cup (in this period the tournament was named Cup of the Soviet Army). CSKA Sofia won the competition, beating Akademik Sofia 1–0 after extra time in the final at the People's Army Stadium in Sofia.

First round

|-
!colspan="3" style="background-color:#D0F0C0; text-align:left;" |Replay

|-
!colspan="3" style="background-color:#D0F0C0; text-align:left;" |Second replay

|-
!colspan="3" style="background-color:#D0F0C0; text-align:left;" |Third replay

|}

Quarter-finals

|}

Semi-finals

|}

Final

Details

References

1951
1950–51 domestic association football cups
Cup